Silver Lode is a 1954 American Technicolor Western film directed by Allan Dwan and starring John Payne, Lizabeth Scott and Dan Duryea.

Plot

The film, with a similar plot to High Noon, tells the story of Dan Ballard (John Payne) and Rose Evans (Lizabeth Scott), who are about to be married on the Fourth of July when Marshal Fred McCarty (Dan Duryea) and his deputies ride into town looking for Ballard. McCarty accuses Ballard of having murdered his brother and has come to arrest him.

At first, the townspeople are on Ballard's side, but gradually they turn against him, especially when they believe that he has killed the town sheriff (Emile Meyer). Ballard tries to prove his innocence and expose McCarty (who appears to be a veiled reference to Senator Joseph McCarthy).

Cast 

 John Payne as Dan Ballard
 Lizabeth Scott as Rose Evans
 Dan Duryea as Fred McCarty
 Dolores Moran as Dolly
 Emile Meyer as Sheriff Wooley
 Robert Warwick as Judge Cranston
 John Hudson as Michael 'Mitch' Evans
 Harry Carey Jr. as Johnson
 Alan Hale Jr. as Kirk
 Stuart Whitman as Wickers
 Frank Sully as Paul Herbert, Telegrapher
 Morris Ankrum as Zachary Evans
 Hugh Sanders as Reverend Field
 Florence Auer as Mrs. Elmwood
 Roy Gordon as Dr. Elmwood

References

External links

The film's entry at "McCarthyism and the Movies"

1954 films
1954 Western (genre) films
American Western (genre) films
Films about McCarthyism
Films directed by Allan Dwan
Independence Day (United States) films
RKO Pictures films
Revisionist Western (genre) films
1950s English-language films
1950s American films